Aleksandar Vujačić (born 19 March 1990) is a Montenegrin professional footballer who plays as a striker for Montenegrin club Mornar.

Club career
On 4 July 2015, Vujačić signed a one-year contract with Maltese club Balzan. He made his debut under coach Oliver Spiteri on 22 August 2015, scoring the last-minute goal in a 1–1 tie against Hibernians.

On 11 July 2017, Vujačić signed a one-year contract with Belarusian club Dynamo Brest.

On 9 January 2019, Vujačić returned to Budućnost in a €10,000 transfer from OFK Petrovac. In July 2019, he suffered an injury to his abdominal wall, for which he underwent surgery.

References

External links 
 
 
 

1990 births
Living people
People from Bar, Montenegro
Montenegrin footballers
Association football forwards
FK Zemun players
FK Mornar players
OFK Petrovac players
FK Budućnost Podgorica players
Balzan F.C. players
Aleksandar Vujacic
FC Dynamo Brest players
Montenegrin First League players
Maltese Premier League players
Aleksandar Vujacic
Belarusian Premier League players
Montenegrin expatriate footballers
Expatriate footballers in Serbia
Montenegrin expatriate sportspeople in Serbia
Expatriate footballers in Malta
Montenegrin expatriate sportspeople in Malta
Expatriate footballers in Thailand
Montenegrin expatriate sportspeople in Thailand
Expatriate footballers in Belarus
Montenegrin expatriate sportspeople in Belarus